With the roster depleted by players leaving for service in World War II, the 1943 Brooklyn Dodgers finished the season in third place.

The team featured five future Hall of Famers: second baseman Billy Herman, shortstop Arky Vaughan, outfielders Paul Waner, and Joe Medwick, and manager Leo Durocher.

Herman finished fourth in MVP voting, after hitting .330 with 100 runs batted in. Vaughan led the league in runs scored and stolen bases.

Offseason 
 December 12, 1942: Johnny Allen and cash were traded by the Dodgers to the Philadelphia Phillies for Rube Melton.
 March 9, 1943: Babe Dahlgren was traded by the Dodgers to the Philadelphia Phillies for Lloyd Waner and Al Glossop.
 March 24, 1943: Schoolboy Rowe was purchased from the Dodgers by the Philadelphia Phillies.
 March 24, 1943: Jack Kraus was traded by the Dodgers to the Philadelphia Phillies for Bobby Bragan.

Regular season

Season standings

Record vs. opponents

Notable transactions 
 April 22, 1943: Johnny Allen was purchased by the Dodgers from the Philadelphia Phillies.
 May 15, 1943: Hal Peck was purchased from the Dodgers by the Chicago Cubs.
 May 20, 1943: Alex Kampouris was purchased from the Dodgers by the Washington Senators.
 May 20, 1943: Newt Kimball was purchased from the Dodgers by the Philadelphia Phillies.
 July 6, 1943: Joe Medwick was purchased from the Dodgers by the New York Giants.
 July 15, 1943: Bobo Newsom were traded by the Dodgers to the St. Louis Browns for Fritz Ostermueller and Archie McKain.
 July 31, 1943: Johnny Allen and Dolph Camilli were traded by the Dodgers to the New York Giants for Bill Lohrman, Bill Sayles and Joe Orengo.
 September 28, 1943: Al Glossop was purchased from the Dodgers by the Chicago Cubs.

Roster

Player stats

Batting

Starters by position 
Note: Pos = Position; G = Games played; AB = At bats; R = Runs; H = Hits; Avg. = Batting average; HR = Home runs; RBI = Runs batted in; SB = Stolen bases

Other batters 
Note: G = Games played; AB = At bats; R = Runs; H = Hits; Avg. = Batting average; HR = Home runs; RBI = Runs batted in; SB = Stolen bases

Pitching

Starting pitchers 
Note: G = Games pitched; GS = Games started; CG = Complete games; IP = Innings pitched; W = Wins; L = Losses; ERA = Earned run average; BB = Bases on balls; SO = Strikeouts

Other pitchers 
Note: G = Games pitched; GS = Games started; CG = Complete games; IP = Innings pitched; W = Wins; L = Losses; ERA = Earned run average; BB = Bases on balls; SO = Strikeouts

Relief pitchers 
Note: G = Games pitched; IP = Innings pitched; W = Wins; L = Losses; SV = Saves; ERA = Earned run average; BB = Bases on balls; SO = Strikeouts

Awards and honors 
1943 Major League Baseball All-Star Game
Billy Herman starter
Augie Galan reserve
Mickey Owen reserve
Dixie Walker reserve
TSN Major League All-Star Team
Billy Herman

League top ten finishers 
Augie Galan
 #2 in NL in on-base percentage (.412)

Billy Herman
 #2 in NL in batting average (.330)
 #3 in NL in RBI (100)
 #3 in NL in hits (193)
 #3 in NL in on-base percentage (.398)

Kirby Higbe
 #5 in NL in strikeouts (108)

Arky Vaughan
 MLB leader in runs scored (112)
 NL leader in stolen bases (20)
 #5 in NL in hits (186)

Whit Wyatt
 #3 in NL in ERA (2.49)

Farm System

Notes

References 
Baseball-Reference season page
Baseball Almanac season page

External links 
1943 Brooklyn Dodgers uniform
Brooklyn Dodgers reference site
Acme Dodgers page 
Retrosheet

Los Angeles Dodgers seasons
Brooklyn Dodgers season
Brooklyn
1940s in Brooklyn
Flatbush, Brooklyn